The 1994–95 League Cup was the twenty-fourth season of the League Cup, rugby league's secondary cup competition known as the Regal Trophy due to sponsorship.

Wigan won the final, beating Warrington 40-10 at the McAlpine Stadium in Huddersfield. The attendance was 19,636.

Background 
This season saw no changes from last season's re-vamping, with no new members and no withdrawals, the number remaining at forty-eight.

The entrants still included two French clubs and eleven junior clubs

The sixteen First Round winners added to the sixteen clubs given byes, gave a total of entrants into the second round as thirty-two.<br/ >

Competition and results

Round 1 - First Round - (a Preliminary Round) 

Involved 16 matches and 32 clubs, with 16 byes

Round 2 - Second  Round 
Involved 16 matches and 32 Clubs

Round 3 - Third  Round 
Involved 8 matches and 16 Clubs

Round 3 - Third  Round Replays 
Involved 1 match and 2 clubs

Round 4 -Quarter Finals 
Involved 4 matches with 8 clubs

Round 5 – Semi-Finals 
Involved 2 matches and 4 Clubs

Final

Teams and scorers 

Scoring - Try = four points - Goal = two points - Drop goal = one point

Prize money 
As part of the sponsorship deal and funds, the prize money awarded to the competing teams for this season is as follows :-

Note - the  author is unable to trace the award amounts for this season. Can anyone help ?

The road to success 
This tree excludes the First Round fixtures

Notes and comments 
1 * AS Saint Estève was a French rugby league team from Perpignan, which in 2000 it merged with nearby neighbours XIII Catalan to form Union Treiziste Catalaneto compete in the Super Leagueas the Catalans Dragons.

2 * XIII Catalan were a French rugby league team from Perpignan, founded in 1935, founding members of the French rugby league championship. In 2000 they merged with AS Saint Estève to form Union Treiziste Catalane (or Catalans Dragons)

3 * The highest score and the highest winning margin, at the  time. The record stood for approximately two days before it was beaten. This record includes club records of (1) joint highest try scorer in a match by Steve Rowan with 6 tries, (2) highest number of goals kicked in a match by Darren Carter with 17, and (3) the highest number of points in a match also by Darren Carter with 17 goals and 2 tries making a total of 42

4 * This beat the record for the highest score, and equalled the at of the highest aggregate win, set two days earlier. This record included the  all time British record of most tries by a centre in a match when Greg Austin scored 9 tries

5 * Queens are a Junior (amateur) club from Leeds

6 * Myson are a Junior (amateur) club from Hull

7 * Bradford Dudley Hill are a Junior (amateur) club from Bradford

8 * Ovenden are a Junior (amateur) club from Halifax

9 * Hensingham are a Junior (amateur) club from Whitehaven

10 * Leigh Miners' Welfare are a Junior (amateur) club from Leigh (formed by merger of Astley & Tyldesley and Hope Rangers - and now Leigh Miners Rangers)

11 * Hemel Stags are a semi professional club based in Hemel Hempstead and playing at the Pennine Way stadium (capacity 2000)

12 * Woolston Rovers are a Junior (amateur) club from Warrington, becoming Warrington Woolston Rovers in 2003 and Warrington Wizards in 2002. the ground is the old Warrington Home Ground of Wilderspool 

13 * West Hull are a Junior (amateur) club from Hull

14 * Saddleworth Rangers are a Junior (amateur) club from Oldham

15 * Thatto Heath are a Junior (amateur) club from St Helens

16 * RUGBYLEAGUEproject gives the attendance as 4,807 but Widnes official archives gives it as 4,831

17  * The McAlpine Stadium is the home ground of Huddersfield Town and Super League side, Huddersfield Giants. The stadium is 40% owned by Kirklees Metropolitan Council and 60% by the two clubs, hosted its first match in August 1994 and seats 24,499 people along with hospitality boxes and conference rooms. Since opening the stadium has been sponsored as The John Smith's Stadium, originally the Alfred McAlpine Stadium and more lately the Galpharm Stadium, is a multi-use sports stadium in Huddersfield in West Yorkshire, England

General information 
The council of the Rugby Football League voted to introduce a new competition, to be similar to The Football Association and Scottish Football Association's "League Cup". It was to be a similar knock-out structure to, and to be secondary to, the Challenge Cup. As this was being formulated, sports sponsorship was becoming more prevalent and as a result John Player and Sons, a division of Imperial Tobacco Company, became sponsors, and the competition never became widely known as the "League Cup".
The competition ran from 1971–72 until 1995–96 and was initially intended for the professional clubs plus the two amateur BARLA National Cup finalists. In later seasons the entries were expanded to take in other amateur and French teams. The competition was dropped due to "fixture congestion" when Rugby League became a summer sport.
The Rugby League season always (until the onset of "Summer Rugby" in 1996) ran from around August-time through to around May-time and this competition always took place early in the season, in the autumn, with the final usually taking place in late January.
The competition was variably known, by its sponsorship name, as the Player's No.6 Trophy (1971–1977), the John Player Trophy (1977–1983), the John Player Special Trophy (1983–1989), and the Regal Trophy in 1989.

See also 
1994-95 Rugby Football League season
Regal Trophy
Rugby league county cups

References

External links
Saints Heritage Society
1896–97 Northern Rugby Football Union season at wigan.rlfans.com 
Hull&Proud Fixtures & Results 1896/1897
Widnes Vikings - One team, one passion Season In Review - 1896-97
The Northern Union at warringtonwolves.org
Huddersfield R L Heritage
Wakefield until I die

League Cup (rugby league)
League Cup
League Cup
League Cup
League Cup